Pulchrana debussyi is a species of true frog, family Ranidae. It is endemic to Sumatra, Indonesia. It is only known from its type locality in the Batak Mountains (also spelled as Battak Mountains). The holotype is now lost, and there are concerns about validity of this taxon—it might be a synonym of Sylvirana nigrovittata. Common name Battak frog has been proposed for it.

There is no information on ecology or habitat requirements of this species that has been classified as "data deficient".

References

debussyi
Amphibians of Indonesia
Endemic fauna of Sumatra
Amphibians described in 1910
Taxa named by Pieter Nicolaas van Kampen